Adıgüzel Dam is an embankment dam on the Büyük Menderes River in Denizli Province, Turkey, built between 1976 and 1989. The dam creates a lake which is 25.9 km ² and irrigates 94,825 hectares.

See also

List of dams and reservoirs in Turkey

References

DSI

Dams in Denizli Province
Hydroelectric power stations in Turkey
Dams completed in 1989